The Asian Junior Squash individual Championships are the event which serves as the individual Asian junior championship for squash players organised by the Asian Squash Federation.

Championships

All time medal table
As of 2019

Past results

Boys

Under 13

Under 15

Under 17

Under 19

Girls

Under 13

Under 15

Under 17

Under 19

See also 
 Squash
 World Junior Squash Championships
 Asian Squash Federation
 Asian Individual Squash Championships
 Asian Squash Team Championships

External links 
 Asian Junior Squash Championships Archive Results
 Asian Junior Squash Championships 2013 SquashSite365 Results

Squash_Individual_Championships
Squash in Asia
Squash tournaments